General Ismail Qasim Naji was the chief of staff of the Transitional Federal Government (TFG) of Somalia and currently the Somali ambassador in Oman. He has served as a senior officer of the Somali army since the administration of Siad Barre, who was removed from power in 1991. Before the formation of the TFG, he also commanded the army of the predecessor Transitional National Government (TNG) of Somalia between 2002–2004.

Military service

Somali National Army

Transitional National Government

From 2004–2004, Gen. Naji served as the military chief of the Transitional National Government (TNG). During this time, the TNG was opposed militarily and politically by the rival Somalia Reconciliation and Restoration Council (SRRC), backed by Hussein Mohamed Farrah Aidid (son of the late warlord Mohamed Farrah Aidid), Mohamed Dhere, and others. Eventually the leadership of the SRRC and the TNG reconciled.

Transitional Federal Government

In November 2004, the TNG was succeeded by the establishment of the Transitional Federal Government (TFG). On April 15, 2005, Gen. Naji was appointed Chief army commander of the TFG.

In October 2005, a report by the UN Monitoring group quoted Gen. Naji as having accepted a large shipment of goods from Yemen in contravention of UN sanctions on arms imports, including 5,000 weapons, hand grenades and antipersonnel mines.

In November 2006, Gen. Naji acknowledged the defection of TFG militia to the Islamic Courts Union (ICU).

On January 17, 2007, Gen. Naji reported what was believed to be Sheikh Sharif Sheikh Ahmed's briefcase, filled with documents, was recovered by government forces from a jungle hideout in southwestern Somalia as conflicting reports emerged the ICU leader had been arrested near the Dadaab refugee camp in the Garissa district of Kenya.

On February 10, 2007, he was replaced as army chief-of-staff by Abdullahi Ali Omar.

Subsequent career

The same day he was dismissed as army chief-of-staff (February 10, 2007), Prime Minister Ali Mohamed Ghedi appointed Ismael Qasim Naji to the position of Ambassador to Oman.

References

Year of birth missing (living people)
Living people
Somalian military leaders
Members of the Transitional Federal Parliament
Somalian generals
Ambassadors of Somalia to Oman